The 2001 World Series of Poker (WSOP) was held at Binion's Horseshoe.

Preliminary events

Main Event
There were 613 entrants to the main event. Each paid $10,000 to enter what was the largest poker tournament ever played in a non-online casino at the time. The 2001 Main Event was the first tournament in history to pay out at least $1,000,000 to two players. Phil Hellmuth made the final table and looked to become a two-time Main Event champion, but fell short in fifth place.

Final table

*Career statistics prior to the beginning of the 2001 Main Event.

Final table results

Other High Finishes
NB: This list is restricted to top 30 finishers with an existing Wikipedia entry.

World Series of Poker
World Series of Poker